Michael Henry (born 7 April 1986 in Montserrat) is a Montserratian footballer who plays for Ideal SC in the Montserrat Championship and has also played for Montserrat.

Career
He has played for Ideal SC since 2004.

References 

Montserratian footballers
Montserrat international footballers
1986 births
Living people
Association football midfielders